The Light Blue and White Union (UCyB) is a minor centre-right political party in Argentina. It was founded in 2007 by Argentine-Colombian businessman and former national deputy Francisco de Narváez. The party stands for economic liberalism and Federal Peronism. The party's name is a reference to the Argentine national colours.

The party now forms part of Federal Consensus and counts with no representation at the federal level.

History
The Light Blue and White Union was formed in 2007 by Francisco de Narváez, then a national deputy for the Justicialist Party. Upon its formation it became part of the PRO Union, which was then an electoral coalition (it would later become a political party in its own right). By 2011, de Narváez and UCyB had broken the alliance with the PRO Union and instead formed UDESO with the Radical Civic Union and the Federal Party to back de Narváez's unsuccessful candidacy for the governorship of Buenos Aires Province.

Ahead of the 2013 legislative election, the party formed an alliance with the Federal Party, the Integration and Development Movement and the Party of Culture, Education and Labour named "United for Liberty and Labour", which only managed to elect 2 deputies to the Chamber of Deputies in Buenos Aires Province. By 2015, the party had become part of United for a New Alternative.

The party did not field any candidates in the 2017 legislative election and only participated in a few minor provincial alliances in Catamarca (where it was part of Citizen's Unity), Córdoba (Union for Córdoba) and Corrientes (Encounter for Corrientes).

In 2019 the Light Blue and White Union joined other centrist and Federal Peronist parties and formed Federal Consensus to back the presidential candidacy of former economy minister Roberto Lavagna.

Electoral performance

President

Chamber of Deputies

References

Political parties established in 2007
2007 establishments in Argentina
Peronist parties and alliances in Argentina
Liberal parties in Argentina